The Rabbinical College of America is a Chabad Lubavitch Chasidic yeshiva in Morristown, New Jersey. The Yeshiva is under the direction of Rabbi Moshe Herson. The growth of the Yeshiva college has had a significant cultural effect on the community and has influenced many Jewish families to move into the area to be near the Yeshiva and the surrounding synagogues. It is supported by Jewish philanthropists such as David T. Chase and Ronald Lauder of Estée Lauder Inc.

Licensed by the New Jersey Commission on Higher Education, the Yeshiva grants a four-year Bachelor's Degree in Religious Studies accredited by the Association of Advanced Rabbinical and Talmudic Schools.

The college is located on an  campus in Morris Township, New Jersey. The campus is the New Jersey Headquarters of the Chabad Lubavitch movement.

Academic programs 
Yeshiva Tomchei Temimim – The international network of Chabad Yeshivas, intended for college-aged men (18–22). Hundreds of its graduates obtained ordination at advanced Rabbinical schools, and serve as Rabbis of Chabad House and community institutions around the world.
Rabbinical ordination program for Tomchei Temimin graduates on-site under the supervision of Rabbi Chaim Schapiro. The ordination degrees have been signed by former Chief Rabbis of Israel, Rabbi Mordechai Eliyahu and Yisroel Meir Lau.
Yeshiva Tiferes Bachurim – One of the first programs worldwide for Ba'alei Teshuva founded in the summer of 1973 by Rabbi Avraham Lipskier, who served as its first Mashpia (and who subsequently founded Yeshiva Tiferes Menachem in Seagate, NY). This program is accredited by the state of New Jersey to grant a Bachelor's Degree in Religious Studies.
There was an ordination program instituted in 1978 with seven students under the supervision of Rabbis Dovid Wichnin, the first Rosh Yeshiva (Headmaster), and Boruch Yorkovitch. The examination committee consisted of Rabbi Sholom Ber Gordon from New Jersey, and Rabbis Avraham Osdoba and Bogomilsky from New York. However, it was phased out in 1979 due to low enrollment. The remaining four students (Rabbis Simcha Frankel, Tzvi Freeman, Shlomo Sawilowsky, Menachem Schmidt) continued their advanced ordination studies after graduation elsewhere. Many other graduates of Tiferes Bachurim subsequently received ordination at other rabbinical institutions. Examples are Rabbis Dovid Rothschild, author of a two volume series in English pertaining to the Lubavitcher Rebbe's holiday essays; and Herschel Finman, who has hosted a radio show (WLQV 1500 am and WPON 1460 am) since 1995. In 2009, the ordination program was reinstituted under the supervision of Rabbi Ya'akov Wagner.
Notable graduates include Rabbi Tzvi Freeman, Dr. Dovid Lazerson, author of Skullcaps n' Switchblades, and Shimon Waronker.
Kollel Tiferes Avreichim for married students, under the supervision of Rabbi Chaim Brafman.
Cheder Lubavitch, an Orthodox day school for boys and girls, whose principal is Rabbi Aaron Wilschanski.
Yeshiva Summer Program, is a summer program for 13- to 14-year-old boys that runs every summer. It includes half a day of learning and half a day of activities, and many trips. It is run by Rabbi Mendel Goldberg.

References

External links
 Official website

Ashkenazi Jewish culture in New Jersey
Chabad schools
Chabad in the United States
Universities and colleges in Morris County, New Jersey
Men's universities and colleges in the United States
Orthodox yeshivas in New Jersey
Chabad yeshivas